Kråkan och Mamma Mu ("The Crow and Mama Moo") was the 1990 edition of Sveriges Radio's Christmas Calendar.

Plot
The cow Mama Moo lives inside the farmer's barn, not far away from the crow ("Kråkan"). They meet every day and are close friends, despite being different.

References
 

1990 radio programme debuts
1990 radio programme endings
Swedish children's radio programs
Sveriges Radio's Christmas Calendar